Facundo Julián Píriz González (born 27 March 1990), commonly known as Facundo Píriz, is a Uruguayan professional footballer who plays as a defensive midfielder for Deportivo Maldonado.

Career
Born in Tarariras, Uruguay, Píriz started his career with Nacional.

In January 2013 he signed a 4.5-year contract with Terek Grozny, of the Russian Premier League, from Nacional for €2.8 million.

On 28 July 2017, he signed with the French club Montpellier on a one-year loan deal with option to purchase. Montpellier officially exercised the purchase option on 18 April 2018.

On 25 September 2019, he signed a one-year contract with Romanian club Rapid București.

International career
Píriz was part of Uruguay's under-20 squad in the 2009 South American Youth Championship.

He also played in Uruguay´s under-22 squad at the 2011 Pan American Games.

Career statistics

Club

Honours
Nacional
 Uruguayan League: 2008–09, 2010–11, 2011–12

Notes

References

External links
 
 

1990 births
Living people
People from Colonia Department
Association football midfielders
Footballers at the 2011 Pan American Games
Uruguayan footballers
Uruguayan expatriate footballers
Uruguay under-20 international footballers
Pan American Games medalists in football
Pan American Games bronze medalists for Uruguay
Medalists at the 2011 Pan American Games
Club Nacional de Football players
FC Akhmat Grozny players
Montpellier HSC players
FC Rapid București players
Club Plaza Colonia de Deportes players
Deportivo Maldonado players
Uruguayan Primera División players
Russian Premier League players
Ligue 1 players
Liga II players
Expatriate footballers in Russia
Expatriate footballers in France
Expatriate footballers in Romania
Uruguayan expatriate sportspeople in Russia
Uruguayan expatriate sportspeople in France
Uruguayan expatriate sportspeople in Romania